Barend Oberholzer, also known as Barry Oberholzer, is a former professional rugby player, an American entrepreneur, helicopter pilot and former intelligence operative.

Early life
Oberholzer was born in Houston, Texas, United States, where his father Barry Oberholzer Sr. was the South African consul-general. He moved to South Africa after his father’s term ended in 1985.

Oberholzer enrolled in the undergraduate course on Counter-Intelligence and Terrorism at the American Military University in 2012.

Career
Oberholzer initially worked as a marketing manager for South African based helicopter company, Base4 Aviation.

Oberholzer claimed that he has been a former intelligence contractor, serving as an informant, for the Joint Terrorism Task Force, Department of Homeland Security, Belgium Customs Intelligence Unit and the United Kingdom’s HM Revenue & Customs Intelligence to counter criminal operations, including narco-terrorism and smuggling networks. When asked, these agencies have declined to comment, citing policy against confirming any individual's involvement as an informant.

Technology 
In 2017, Oberholzer founded SWORD, a mobile internet of things threat detection device, in an attempt to prevent casualties in mass shooting. The device is marketed as being able to "identify concealed threats, such as weapons, knives and explosive devices, and to identify people on customized watchlists."

Involvement with the South African government 
Oberholzer served as a managing director of 360 Aviation. In 2005, he advertised a Bell Helicopter on Barnstormers.com, an online marketplace for aviation. He was later contacted by Hussein Safari, an Iranian businessman who would help Oberholzer circumvent sanctions against Iran by selling American helicopters to Iran for a mark-up from South Africa. These deals garnered him over 3 million South African rands per transaction. Business increased in 2008 when South African President Thabo Mbeki encouraged more international trade between South Africa and Iran. 360 Aviation set up its own front company, Gemini Moon, to sell aircraft and parts, and set up other front operations for different Iranian entities.

In March 2012, Oberholzer informed the Federal Bureau of Investigation's Joint Terrorism Task Force of these activities in exchange for immunity, fearing potential jail time as an American citizen if he had gotten arrested. This information included attempts to garner governmental backing in June 2011 from the South African Deputy President Kgalema Motlanthe and his partner Gugu Mtshali in exchange for monetary compensation. Motlanthe has challenged these claims. The negotiations, that failed, would have set up a five year contract of at least 450 million Rands for Gemini Moon to supply the National Iranian Oil Company with helicopters and parts. This would have violated the 2010 UN arms embargo.

While the United States government could not confirm nor deny Oberholzer's involvement as an intelligence operative, The Sunday Times has corroborated his statements.

Rugby 
Barry Oberholzer represented the United States of America in two Junior World Championships.

Controversies
Oberholzer allegedly impersonated former CIA director and retired U.S. Army General David Petraeus in emails to venture capital firms in 2018, according to a criminal complaint filed in the Southern District of New York in February 2021.

Books
 The Black Market Concierge: Sanction Busting, Smuggling & Spying for America, Black Box Entertainment (November 26, 2016), .

References

1983 births
African-American businesspeople
American businesspeople
American technology company founders
American technology chief executives
American technology businesspeople
Businesspeople from Texas
Living people